Rathana Ella ("field of gems"), at 101 m (331 ft), is the 14th highest waterfall in Sri Lanka Country , situated in Hasalaka City , Kandy District.

The area surrounding the waterfall is extremely verdant.  The main occupation of the villagers in Rathana Ella is paddy cultivation.  The Rathana Ella waterfall is very important to the village, as it supplies water to the irrigation works and paddy cultivation.

In the past, people built small anicut to get water from Rathana Ella for their agricultural activities.  Rathana Ella supplies enough water to assist 200 farmers to earn a living in paddy cultivation.

See also
 List of waterfalls of Sri Lanka

References

Waterfalls of Sri Lanka
Populated places in Kandy District
Waterfalls in Central Province, Sri Lanka